Sir Basil Templer Graham-Montgomery, 5th Baronet (March 1, 1852 - October 4, 1928) was the son of Sir Graham Graham-Montgomery, 3rd Baronet Stanhope (July 9, 1823 - June 2, 1901) and Alice Hope Johnstone (1830 - December 16, 1890). He succeeded to the title of 5th Baronet Montgomery of Stanhope on 8 November 1902.

Graham-Montgomery invented a pattern of leather webgear similar to the Sam Browne Belt that became part of the dress uniform for Rifle Regiment officers.

He is buried with his family in ground east of Kinross House.

Honors
He gained the rank of lieutenant in the service of the 60th Rifles. He gained the rank of honorary lieutenant-colonel in the service of the Kinross-shire Volunteer Regiment.

Family
He married, firstly, Mary Katherine Moncreiffe, daughter of Sir Thomas Moncreiffe of that Ilk, 7th Baronet Moncreiffe. and Lady Louisa Hay-Drummond, on 26 October 1880. He and Mary Katherine Moncreiffe were divorced in 1905.

He married, secondly, Theresa Blanche Verschoyle, daughter of Lt.-Col. Henry William Verschoyle, on 6 June 1905. He died on 4 October 1928 at age 76, without male issue.
     
First Marriage (m.1880 - 1905) Mary Katherine Moncreiffe (December 3, 1858 - July 30, 1910)
Walter Basil Graham-Montgomery (July 1881 - March 23, 1928)
Lena Graham-Montgomery (October 1882 - September 22, 1958)
The son died in the lifetime of the father.  
Second Marriage (m. 1905 - 1928) Theresa Blanche Verschoyle (April 1862 - June 24, 1936)
Marriage produced no issue.

References

Baronets in the Baronetage of the United Kingdom
King's Royal Rifle Corps officers